Berești is a town in Galați County, Romania. It is situated in the historical region of Western Moldavia.

Natives 
 Paul Bujor (1862–1952), zoologist
 Maria Grapini (b. 1954), businesswoman and politician

References

Populated places in Galați County
Towns in Romania
Localities in Western Moldavia